The Tabangao Refinery is an oil refinery in Batangas City, Batangas, Philippines. It was owned and operated by Pilipinas Shell Petroleum Corporation with the capacity to process .

History
The Tabangao Refinery's construction began in 1960 and was completed in 1962.
The oil refinery's inauguration was held on July 28, 1962 which was attended by then-Philippine President Diosdado Macapagal.

In 1993, expansion and renovation of the Tabangao Refinery (called STAR or Shell Tabangao Asset Renewal) began, to replace the old facilities including two crude distillers built in the 1960s. The expansion was completed in 1995 and the capacity of the refinery increased to 

Due to the impact of the COVID-19 pandemic, operations of the refinery was suspended on May 24, 2020 and in August 2020, Pilipinas Shell decided to permanently close the refinery and convert the site into an import terminal. The closure left the Bataan Refinery of Petron as the sole operating oil refinery in the Philippines.

References

Oil refineries in the Philippines
Buildings and structures in Batangas City
1962 establishments in the Philippines
2020 disestablishments in the Philippines
Shell plc buildings and structures